Yakup Şevki Subaşı (1876 in Harput – December 20, 1939 in Istanbul), also known as Yakub Shevki Pasha, was a general of the Ottoman Army and the Turkish Army.

See also
List of high-ranking commanders of the Turkish War of Independence

Sources

1876 births
1939 deaths
People from Elazığ
Ottoman Military Academy alumni
Ottoman Military College alumni
Ottoman military personnel of the Balkan Wars
Ottoman military personnel of World War I
Ottoman Army generals
Pashas
Malta exiles
Turkish military personnel of the Greco-Turkish War (1919–1922)
Recipients of the Medal of Independence with Red Ribbon (Turkey)
Turkish Army generals
Burials at Turkish State Cemetery
Commanders of the Second Army of Turkey